The Sword is a 1980 Hong Kong wuxia film co-written and directed by Patrick Tam and starring Adam Cheng.

Plot summary
A swordsman wants to fight an evil man; but the swordsman throws his sword into the sea after fighting because he wants to live in peace. The film is set in the ancient city of the Song dynasty. It was filmed in a provincial town of China Shandong province (where Confucius was born)

Cast
Adam Cheng as Lee Mak-yin
Norman Chui as Lin Wan
Bonnie Ngai as Yuen Kei
JoJo Chan as Yin Siu-yu
Tien Feng as Fa Chin-shu
Eddy Ko as Chan Tit-yee
Hoi Sang Lee as Chou Huan
Ng Tung as Wang Shi-qi
Lau Yat-fan as Old pigeon man
Lau Siu-ming as Caretaker
Chui Kit as Fa Ying-chi

References

External links
 

1980 films
1980 action films
1980 martial arts films
Hong Kong action films
Hong Kong martial arts films
Wuxia films
1980s Cantonese-language films
Golden Harvest films
Films set in the Song dynasty
Films shot in Shandong
Films directed by Patrick Tam (film director)
1980s Hong Kong films